The Drifters' Golden Hits is a 1968 compilation album by American doo wop/R&B vocal group The Drifters. The collection of the bands' later hits charted at #22 on Billboard's "Black Albums" chart and at #122 on the "Pop Albums" chart.

The album was included in Robert Christgau's "Basic Record Library" of 1950s and 1960s recordings, published in Christgau's Record Guide: Rock Albums of the Seventies (1981). In 2012, Rolling Stone listed the album at #459 in its list of "Rolling Stone's 500 Greatest Albums of All Time". Originally released on the Atlantic label, the album has been re-released on CD by Atlantic.  A Drifters' compilation by the same name was released by Intercontinental records in 1996, but it has a different track listing.

Track listing

Personnel

Performance

The Drifters
Ben E. King - lead vocals (tracks 1, 3 - 6); backing vocals (track 2)
Johnny Lee Williams - lead vocals (track 2); backing vocals (tracks 3-6)
Rudy Lewis - lead vocals (tracks 7 - 9)
Johnny Moore - lead vocals (tracks 10 - 12)
Charlie Thomas - backing vocals (all tracks)
Dock Green - backing vocals (tracks 1 - 8)
Gene Pearson - backing vocals (tracks 9 - 12)
Elsbeary Hobbs - backing vocals (tracks 1 - 6) 
Tommy Evans - backing vocals (tracks 7 - 9)
Johnny Terry - backing vocals (tracks 10 - 12)
Abdul Samad - guitar (tracks 2 - 12)
Reggie Kimber - guitar (track 1)

Other personnel
Doris Troy - additional backing vocals (tracks 5 - 7)
Dee Dee Warwick - additional backing vocals (tracks 5 - 7)
Dionne Warwick - additional backing vocals (tracks 5 - 7)
Cissy Houston - additional backing vocals (tracks 5 - 7)

Production
Stan Applebaum – arranger
Bert Berns – producer
Charlie Brown – liner notes
Ray Ellis – arranger
Loring Eutemey – design
Jerry Leiber – producer
Jonny Meadow – research
Zal Schreiber – mastering
Garry Sherman – arranger
Mike Stoller – producer
Teacho Wiltshire – arranger

References

The Drifters albums
1968 greatest hits albums
albums produced by Bert Berns
Albums produced by Jerry Leiber
Albums produced by Mike Stoller
Atlantic Records compilation albums